Stylianos "Steve" Giatzoglou (alternate spellings: Yatzoglou, Yantzoglou; Greek: Στυλιανός "Στηβ" Γιατζόγλου; born 11 December 1949), is a Greek American professional basketball coach, and the president of the Union of Greek Basketball Athletes. He's also a former basketball player, having competed professionally in the Greek Basket League. During his playing career, his nickname was "The Lion".

Playing career

College career
Giatzoglou played college basketball at Connecticut College, under the name Steve Young.

Professional career
Giatzoglou's pro career was noted for his successes with the Greek Basket League club Olympiacos. He's considered today as one of the greatest players in the club's history. With Olympiacos, he won 2 Greek League championships and 4 Greek Cups. He was the Greek Cup Finals Top Scorer in 1977, 1978, 1979, and 1980. He also played with the Greek club PAOK.

In the top-tier level Greek League, he scored a total of 6,044 points, which is the 10th most total points scored in the competition, since the 1963–64 season.

National team career
Giatzoglou made his debut with Greece national basketball team on 6 May 1973. He played in 115 games, scoring a total of 1,468 points, for a scoring average of 12.8 points per game.

Giatzoglou played in 3 EuroBasket tournaments with Greece's national team : in 1973, 1975, and 1979. His last game with the Greek national team was on 18 February 1981, in a friendly game against the Bulgarian national basketball team.

Coaching career
As a basketball head coach, Giatzoglou worked in several clubs in Greece, including: Olympiacos, Sporting, Iraklis, Aris, AEK, Pagrati, Peristeri, Gymnastikos S. Larissas, Aigaleo, and Kavala. In 2014, Giatzoglou was hired as assistant coach to work in South Korea, with the Goyang Orions of the Korean Basketball League. In 2015, Giatzoglou returned to Greece to coach Kavala.

In 2018, Panionios hired Giatzoglou to be the club's new head coach. However, the club released him from the position before he coached the team in any games, due to a backlash from the team's fans, that was a result of Giatzoglou's personal political views.

Awards and accomplishments

Pro career
 10th all-time leading scorer of the Greek Basketball Championship, with 6,044 total points scored in the Greek A National League (1963–64 season to present).

Olympiacos
2× Greek League Champion: (1976, 1978)
4× Greek Cup Winner: (1976, 1977, 1978, 1980)
4× Greek Cup Finals Top Scorer (1977–1980)

Greek national team
1972 Balkan Championship: 
1974 Balkan Championship: 
1976 Balkan Championship: 
1979 Mediterranean Games: 
1979 Balkan Championship: 
1980 Balkan Championship:

Personal life
In October 2016, Giatzoglou endorsed the Neo-Nazi political party Golden Dawn, and attended the celebration of their newspaper's 1,000th issue.

In 2020, he joined the Greek nationalist party Greeks for the Fatherland as a party executive.

References

Additional sources
Legends of the Legend : Steve Giatzoglou at the Olympiacos website
Steve Giatzoglou, FIBA website
Steve Giatzoglou, FIBA Europe website
Τα “κανόνια” του ελληνικού Πρωταθλήματος: Στιβ Γιατζόγλου 

1949 births
Living people
AEK B.C. coaches
Aigaleo B.C. coaches
American men's basketball players
American people of Greek descent
Aris B.C. coaches
Connecticut College Camels men's basketball players
Connecticut College alumni
Greek basketball coaches
Greek men's basketball players
Greek Basket League players
Gymnastikos S. Larissas B.C. coaches
Iraklis Thessaloniki B.C. coaches
Kavala B.C. coaches
Olympiacos B.C. coaches
Olympiacos B.C. players
Pagrati B.C. coaches
P.A.O.K. BC players
Peristeri B.C. coaches
Point guards
Shooting guards
Sporting B.C. coaches
Competitors at the 1979 Mediterranean Games
Mediterranean Games gold medalists for Greece
Mediterranean Games medalists in basketball